Ikhwan raids on Transjordan were a series of attacks by the Ikhwan, irregular Arab tribesmen of Najd, on Transjordan between 1922 and 1924. The repeated Wahhabi incursions from Najd into southern parts of his territory were the most serious threat to emir Abdullah's position in Transjordan. The emir was powerless to repel those raids by himself, thus the British maintained a military base, with a small air force, at Marka, close to Amman. The British military force was the primary obstacle against the Ikhwan, helping Emir Abdullah to secure his rule over Transjordan.

Background
With the defeat of the Hashemites in the Nejd-Hejaz War of 1919, and a failure to establish a Hashemite domain over greater Syria, the British hoped to secure Transjordan and Iraq as Hashemite Kingdoms, and did put a significant effort to secure them from external and internal threats. The military assistance of the British to Emir Abdullah of Transjordan was used to help with the suppression of local rebellions at Kura and later by Sultan Adwan, in 1921 and 1923 respectively. They also played a crucial role in the major invasions by the Wahhabi tribesmen of Nejd (the Ikhwan). While Transjordan experienced internal stability during 1922–1923, a new external threat emerged from the south east of the country. The Wahhabi Ikhwan movement, King Ibn Saud's tool of territorial expansion, advanced northwards and westwards, and arrived at the undemarcated borders of Transjordan in summer 1922. The Ikhwan were a cross-tribal striking force, whose religious fervour combined with the support of the King was too strong a military challenge for the Arabian tribes. The Wahabi threat brought forward a merger of interests between the nomadic tribes within Transjordan and the Transjordanian government, and for the first time since its establishment the latter was in a more balanced position vis-à-vis these tribes.

First major raid
The Ikhwan initiated their first attack on Transjordan by massacring two villages 12 miles south of Amman belonging to the tribe of Bani Sakhr. In a two-day battle, the tribesmen of the Hadid tribe along with remnants of what was left of the Bani Sakhr joined up and managed to defeat the raiders. The raiders were intercepted by British armored cars and planes only after they had begun to withdraw.

Second major raid
In August 1924, a larger Ikhwan militia force, numbering some 4,500 raiders, travelled 1,600 kilometers from Najd (in modern-day Saudi Arabia) to attack Transjordan, a British protectorate. Fifteen kilometers south of Amman, the raiders engaged again with the villages of Bani Sakhr, when they were attacked by the British Royal Air Force (RAF). The Ikhwan army suffered heavy casualties, with the death toll reaching 500. The raided villages suffered 130 dead.

Aftermath

Other Ikhwan raids occurred during the 1927–1930 Ikhwan Revolt against the authority of Ibn Saud. The Ikhwanis raided on southern Iraq in November 1927, and on Kuwait in January 1928, in which they looted camels and sheep. On both occasions, though they raided brutally, they suffered heavy retaliations from the RAF and Kuwaitis. The Ikhwan were eventually defeated by Ibn Saud's regular forces and their leadership slain. The remnants were incorporated into regular Saudi units.

See also

Sultan bin Najad
Kuwait-Najd Border War
Saudi Arabian National Guard
List of modern conflicts in the Middle East

References

History of Saudi Arabia
Conflicts in 1922
Conflicts in 1923
Conflicts in 1924
Emirate of Transjordan
1920s in Transjordan
1922 in Transjordan
1923 in Transjordan
1924 in Transjordan
Ikhwan